These are the number-one hits on the Top 100 Singles chart in 1979 as published by Cash Box magazine.

See also
1979 in music
List of Hot 100 number-one singles of 1979 (U.S.)

References
http://cashboxmagazine.com/archives/70s_files/1979.html

1979
1979 record charts
1979 in American music